Simon Aspelin and Todd Perry were the defending champions, but did not participate this year.

Mark Knowles and Daniel Nestor won in the final 6–2, 6–3, against Chris Haggard and Wesley Moodie.

Seeds

Draw

Draw

External links
Draw

Doubles
2006 ATP Tour